Memorial Park Jajinci is located on the territory of Belgrade municipality Voždovac, on the 11th kilometre on the way to the Аvala mountain. It was built in the location of the military shooting range used by the Armed Forces of the Kingdom of Yugoslavia, and which during the Second World War became the place of the terrible suffering of the innocent population on the territory of the occupied Serbia.

History 
With the invasion of Poland by the Third Reich on September 1, 1939, started a war conflict of unprecedented scale and intensity, waged everywhere and by all means, so that historians, using the term originated during the war, rightly called it "total war". The Axis powers waged the war to such an extent wantonly, that all the valid regulations of international law were virtually violated, and crimes that they committed were of such scope and character, that it was necessary to create for them the new provisions of international public law. Images of hunger, gas chambers, crematoria, mass executions, almost dead people as the result of "scientific experiments", were a reality in which lived and died millions of Europeans. Humiliated, in pain and suffering, they were deprived of their elementary status of human being and reduced to occurrence, number, statistical data, and in best case, to manpower, useful and necessary only to the limit of physical strength. From 1941 to 1944, the population of Serbia and Belgrade, through the entire system of prisons, concentration camps and execution places, was included in this image of collective suffering. Immediately after the German occupying troops entered Belgrade on April 12, 1941, began reprisals against population. They introduced the practice of constant holding of hostages and the threat of their execution, if in any way resisted the occupier. The establishment of concentration camps in "Topovske šupe" in Autokomanda (urban area of Belgrade), in Banjica (urban area of Belgrade) in barracks of 18th Infantry Regiment, the concentration camp Sajmište in the facilities of the former Fair Complex on the left bank of the Sava river and "Milišića ciglana" in Zvezdara (urban area of Belgrade), marked the destiny of Belgrade in a very special way. It was the only capital city in occupied Europe, on whose urban land were formed concentration camps. The executions, organized and conducted by German occupying forces, lasted every day from July 15, 1941 until the end of 1943. The liquidation of hostages and prisoners was conducted at several locations in Belgrade and its surroundings: Bežanijska kosa, Jewish Cemetery, Bubanj Potok, Central Cemetery, Мarinkova bara, villages of Jabuka, Skela, Mali Požarevac, Ralja.

Shooting range 

Shooting range in Jajinci, by number of victims and brutal methodology in liquidation and concealing crimes against innocent civilians, stands out from all the other places for execution. The preserved photos and statements of a small number of survivors testify to suffering and pain of Serbs, Jews, Roma and other hostages of fascist regime in Belgrade and Serbia. In the period from 8 November 1943 to 2 April 1944, seeking to remove the traces of mass crimes, the Gestapo conducted the organized exhumation and the burning of the remains of victims. The War Crimes Commission, formed immediately after the Second World War, after the investigation, gave the information that 82,000 people were killed at the shooting range Jajinci. The recent researches indicate the number of 65,000 killed. The Generals Peko Dapčević and Vladimir Ivanovič Ždanov, commanders of troops that liberated Belgrade on October 20, 1944, laid the first wreaths at the place where mass executions were carried out, which represents even the first homage paid to innocent victims of fascist terror.

Foundation 
Memorial Park Jajinci consists of several segments and its formation started on July 7, 1951, by placing the monument at the entrance of the memorial complex. The academic sculptor Stevan Bodnarov. and the architect Leon Kabiljo are the authors of this monument. The works on the Memorial Park, established in 1960, continued even in the coming decades, where we note a lot of unrealized public competitions for design of the monument dedicated to the victims of fascism. Finally, the solution of the author, academic sculptor Vojin Stojić, for the colossal monument, was adopted and realized in 1988. Even the architects Branko Bon and Brana Mirković participated in the arrangement of related facilities and green area of the Memorial Park. In 1986, by the Decision of the Assembly of the City of Belgrade, the Memorial Park Jajinci was proclaimed a cultural monument – important place.

Sources and the literature 
 The archives of Yugoslavia, Belgrade, The Fund of the State Commission for Investigating the Crimes of the Occupying Forces and  Their Helpers. 
 Milan Koljanin, German Concentration Camp on Belgrade fairground 1941-1944, Belgrade, 1992.
 Venceslav Glišić, The Crimes of the Nazis in Belgrade 1941-1944, Belgrade in the war and revolution 1941-1945, Belgrade, 1971.

References 

Monuments and memorials in Serbia
Serbia in World War II
Parks in Belgrade
Yugoslav World War II monuments and memorials
World War II monuments and memorials in Serbia
Memorial parks